Garlands Crossing is a small community in the Canadian province of Nova Scotia, located in  The Municipality of the District of West Hants in Hants County.

References

Communities in Hants County, Nova Scotia